Jean-Marie Michel (born 28 April 1955) is a former French racing cyclist. He rode in the 1979 and 1980 Tour de France.

References

External links
 

1955 births
Living people
French male cyclists
People from Talence
Sportspeople from Gironde
Cyclists from Nouvelle-Aquitaine
21st-century French people
20th-century French people